Surkhab, meaning Red river in Persian, may refer to:

Places
 Surkhab (Kabul), a tributary of the Kabul River in Afghanistan
 Kunduz River, Afghanistan, called the Surkhab River in its higher reaches
 Vakhsh River in Tajikistan, also called the Surkhab or Surkhob
 Sorkhab, Hamadan, a village in Iran, also called Surkhab

Other
 Ruddy shelduck, a duck native to India and Pakistan

See also
 Sorkhab (disambiguation)